Pekalongan is a city of Central Java, Indonesia. It was formerly the seat of Pekalongan Regency on the northern coast of the province, but is now an independent municipality within the province. The city is Central Java's most important port, and is known for its batik. Since December 2014, Pekalongan is a member of UNESCO's World's Creative Cities Network. Pekalongan is the first Indonesian city and first South East Asian city listed as member of UNESCO's World's Creative Cities Network

The Dutch name of the city is 'Pacalongan'.

History 
The coastal area around Pekalongan was part of the ancient Holing (Kalingga) kingdom. The 7th century Sojomerto inscription, discovered in neighboring Batang Regency, Central Java, is linked with Kalingga as well as the ancestor of the Sailendras. The exact location of the Kalingga capital is unclear however, that it was suggested lies somewhere between Pekalongan and Jepara. However it is most likely that Kalingga was located in Pekalongan instead of Jepara, since there is similarity of names between Kalingga and Pekalongan. The name probably slightly shifted over centuries, from Kalingga, Kaling, Kalong, and later added with pe- -an circumfix forming "Pekalongan".

The history of Pekalongan dated back to the early 12th century. A book written in 1178 by a Song dynasty official already had record of Pekalongan, then known to Chinese merchants as "Pukalong", it was then a seaport of Java (then known as Dvapa); the king of Java lived at Pukalong, knotted his hair at the back of his head, while his people wore short hair and wrapped their body with colorfully weaved cloth. Chinese merchant ship set sail from Canton during November, with the aid of fair wind sailed nonstop day and night, arrived at Pukalong in about one month. The people made wine from coconuts, produced very delicious red and white cane sugar, the kingdom made coins out of bronze and copper, 60 copper coins exchanged for one tael of gold. Local produces included pepper, clove, sandalwood, eaglewood and white round cardamom.

Pekalongan became a part of the empire of the Sultanate of Mataram through treaty and marriage alliances by the early 17th century. The area was on the geographic periphery of the empire, which was based in interior central Java. However, it was a wealthy area, and by the end of the 17th century, the substantial money and produce it sent to the center made it a key part of Mataram's realm. The area went into economic decline during the 18th century, and the Dutch East India Company began to gain substantial influence over the area's political and economic life. The Dutch built a fort in the city in 1753; this fort still stands.

From the 1830s, the Pekalongan area became a major producer of sugar. Sugarcane had been grown in the area since the early 12th century, as recorded in Chinese history books, but production expanded substantially during the mid-19th century due to Dutch efforts. Initially, production was boosted through compulsory corvée labor; the Dutch colonial government took advantage of longstanding Javanese expectations that the peasantry contributes a part of their labor to the state. Between the 1860s and the 1890s, this system was phased out, and workers were paid directly. The colonial sugar industry collapsed during the Great Depression of the 1930s, but sugar remains a key export of the area in independent Indonesia.

On October 8, 1945, an anti "Swapraja"/anti feudalism movement called Three Regions Movement/"Gerakan Tiga Daerah" was established in Tegal, Pekalongan, and Brebes. The goal of this movement was to replace the blue blood regents (related to the kings from Jogyakarta and Surakarta) with ordinary people. According to the leaders of this movement, the old regents had cooperated with Japanese during World War II and sent people to the Japanese slave labor camps.

The main leader of this movement was Sarjiyo who became the new regent of Pekalongan. Other leaders of this movement were Kutil, K. Mijaya, and Ir. Sakirman. Ir Sakirman was the local leader of Indonesian Communist Party (PKI).

The old regents were arrested, stripped naked, and dragged into the prisons. Other government officials and police officers were kidnapped and massacred at Talang bridge. This movement also started a racial riot against ethnic Chinese in Brebes.

The government of Republic of Indonesia (RI) in Jogyakarta disagree with this movement and declared it as an illegal movement.

On November 4, 1945, the movement attacked Indonesian army HQ and the regent office in Pekalongan. The rebels were defeated by Indonesian army in a fierce battle on December 21, 1945. Most leaders of this movement were arrested and thrown into the prisons. This rebellion is called Three Regions Affair.

Geographic 
Pekalongan city extend between 6º50’42"–6º55’44" South latitude and 109º37’55"–109º42’19" East longitude. Based on fictive coordinates, Pekalongan extend between 510.00 – 518.00 km longitudinal and 517.75 – 526.75 km crosswise. The farthest distance from north to south is ± 9 km, and west to east is ± 7 km. The administrative border of Pekalongan city are:

Climate
Pekalongan has a tropical rainforest climate (Af) with moderate rainfall from June to October and heavy to very heavy rainfall from November to May.

Administrative districts 
Pekalongan city is divided into four districts, listed below with their areas and their populations at the 2010 Census, and the latest official estimates (for mid 2019).

Note: (a) except the kelurahan of Tirto, which has a post code of 51151.

Transportation 
Pekalongan city is easy to reach because Pekalongan is city crossings between Jakarta and Surabaya. Pekalongan is connected to Trans-Java Expressway by Pemalang-Batang Toll Road.  All passenger trains from west or east are stop at Pekalongan train station.

Tourism Place 
Pekalongan has many tourism places, such as:
 Batik Museum
 Kauman Batik Tourism Village
 Pesindon Batik Tourism Village
 Medono ATBM (Non Automatic Weaving Machine) Tourism Village
 Landungsari Canting Tourism Village
 Pasir Kencana Beach
 Slamaran Indah Beach
 Pekalongan Mangrove Park
 Heroes Monument
 Jetayu Culture Area

Business

The city is known for its batik. The dyed fabric is produced both by hand in small-scale industries, and printed in larger factories. A mainstay of the economy, the industry collapsed during Indonesia's economic crisis in 1998, but it has partially recovered since. But now, Pekalongan has many business and industries places, such as :
 Traditional (wood) and Modern (fiberglass) Shipyard
 Small-scale batik industries
 Small-scale snack industries
 Fishing Port
 Fish canning factory
 Shopping mall
 Luxury Hotel

Natives
George Junus Aditjondro, (1946-2016), sociologist
Beb Bakhuys, (1909-1982), Dutch football player and manager
Maria Dermoût (1888-1962), Indo novelist
Hartono Rekso Dharsono, (1925-1996), first Secretary General of ASEAN
Abdul Rahman Saleh, (1941-), former Attorney General of Indonesia
Aziz Sattar (1925-2014), actor
Hoegeng Iman Santoso, (1921-2004), (former Chief of the Indonesian National Police)
Thio Tjin Boen, (1885-1940), novelist
Joe Hin Tjio, (1919-2001), scientist
Muhammad Ridho Djazulie, (1992-..), Indonesian professional footballer

Sources
Knight, G.R. (1995) Gully Coolies, Weed-Women and Snijvolk: The Sugar Industry Workers of North Java in the Early Twentieth Century. Modern Asian Studies 28(1):51-76.
Ricklefs, M.C. (1986) Some Statistical Evidence on Javanese Social, Economic and Demographic History in the Later Seventeenth and Eighteenth Centuries. Modern Asian Studies 20(1):1-32.

Gallery

References

External links
  Military History Centre/Three regions affair
  Military History Centre/Battle on December 21, 1945
 Pekalongan official government website
 Requests for Wikipedia Boso Kalongan
 Pekalongan's Creative City website

 
Populated places in Central Java